HMS Conflict was a schooner of the Royal Navy, built by John Cuthbert, Millers Point, New South Wales and launched on 11 February 1873.

Royal Navy service
She commenced service on the Australia Station at Sydney in August 1873 for anti-blackbirding operations in the South Pacific. She was part of a punitive mission in 1879 in the New Hebrides.

In 1880, she sighted the Conflict Group, which bears her name.

She was paid off in 1882 and sold to Captain Thomas Brown.

Catalpa incident
On 1 April 1876, Conflict visited the port of Fremantle, remaining there until 10 April.  Her presence unwittingly threw into confusion an elaborate conspiracy to free six Irish Fenian prisoners on 6 April and transport them to America aboard the whaler Catalpa. The escape was postponed and successfully executed after the gunboat's departure.

Mercantile service
Conflict left Suva for Levuka on 9 October and was wrecked on a reef midway between the two. There were no casualties and the ship was left stranded upright on the reef, signalling that she needed no assistance.  By 12 October Captain Brown had returned to Levuka and reported that Conflict was a total loss.

Notes

References

Bastock, John (1988), Ships on the Australia Station, Child & Associates Publishing Pty Ltd; Frenchs Forest, Australia. 

1873 ships
Ships built in New South Wales
Victorian-era naval ships of the United Kingdom
Shipwrecks of Fiji